William Broadbridge (1 October 1790 – 19 April 1860) was an English professional cricketer who played first-class cricket from 1817 to 1830.  He was a brother of Jem Broadbridge and a cousin of George Millyard.

A right-handed batsman and occasional wicket-keeper who played for Sussex, he made 25 known appearances in first-class matches.

References

1790 births
1860 deaths
English cricketers
English cricketers of 1787 to 1825
English cricketers of 1826 to 1863
Sussex cricketers
Left-Handed v Right-Handed cricketers
The Bs cricketers